Pigilinskaya is a rural locality (a village) in Noginskoye Rural Settlement, Syamzhensky District, Vologda Oblast, Russia. The population was 95 as of 2002.

Geography 
Pigilinskaya is located 18 km north of Syamzha (the district's administrative centre) by road. Davydovskaya is the nearest rural locality.

References 

Rural localities in Syamzhensky District